Joanne Flockhart is a retired female badminton player of Scotland.

Career
She won the bronze medal at the 1977 IBF World Championships in mixed doubles with Billy Gilliland.

References

Scottish female badminton players
Living people
Year of birth missing (living people)
Commonwealth Games medallists in badminton
Commonwealth Games silver medallists for Scotland
Badminton players at the 1978 Commonwealth Games
Medallists at the 1978 Commonwealth Games